Nova Gente is a Portuguese language weekly celebrity and society magazine published in Queluz, Lisbon, Portugal.

History and profile
Nova Gente was established in 1976. The magazine is the successor of Flama, another magazine. Nova Gente is part of the Impala Group, which also owns Maria, a women's magazine. The company also publishes Nova Gente on a weekly basis. Its headquarters is in Queluz, Lisbon.

The magazine is a tabloid publication and offers society/celebrity-related content for adult women.

Humberto Simões is one of the former editors-in-chief of Nova Gente.

Circulation
Nova Gente sold 185,000 copies between January and September 2000. In 2003 the circulation of the magazine was about 200,000 copies.

Its circulation was 144,000 copies in 2007, making it the best-selling magazine in its category in Portugal. The weekly sold 127,728 copies in 2010 and 121,231 copies in 2011. The circulation of the magazine was 112,753 copies in 2012. Between September and October 2013 it was 101,175 copies.

See also
 List of magazines in Portugal

References

External links

1976 establishments in Portugal
Celebrity magazines
Magazines established in 1976
Magazines published in Lisbon
Portuguese-language magazines
Weekly magazines published in Portugal
Women's magazines